Gissur Teitsson or Gissur the White was a chieftain or goði in Iceland at the turn of the 10th and 11th centuries. He played a preeminent role in the Christianisation of Iceland. 

He was the father of Ísleifur Gissurarson and the grandfather of Gissur Ísleifsson, who served as the first two bishops of Iceland.

Footnotes

References

Converts to Christianity from pagan religions
Icelandic Christians
Gissur Teitsson
Goðar